is a private university in Fujikawaguchiko, Yamanashi, Japan. It was established in 2003.

External links
 Official website 

Educational institutions established in 2003
Private universities and colleges in Japan
Universities and colleges in Yamanashi Prefecture
Fujikawaguchiko, Yamanashi
2003 establishments in Japan